Corinne Dibnah (born 29 July 1962) is an Australian professional golfer.

Dibnah played on the ALPG Tour and the Ladies European Tour (LET). She won the 1991 LET Order of Merit after winning three tour events that year.

Amateur wins
1981 Australian Women's Amateur
1983 NSW Junior Amateur, NSW Ladies Amateur, New Zealand 72 Hole Strokeplay Championship, New Zealand Ladies Amateur

Professional wins (17)

Ladies European Tour wins (13)
1986 (2) Trusthouse Forte Ladies' Classic, Kristianstad Ladies Open
1987 (2) James Capel Guernsey Open, Qualitair Ladies' Spanish Open
1988 (2) Bloor Homes Eastleigh Classic, Weetabix Women's British Open
1989 (1) Variety Club Celebrity Classic
1990 (1) Trophée Internationale Coconut Skol
1991 (3) BMW European Masters, Spanish Classic, BMW Italian Ladies' Open
1993 (1) Holiday Inn Leiden Ladies' Open
1994 (1) BMW Italian Ladies' Open

ALPG Tour wins (3)
1990 FAI Kooralbyn Valley Classic, Coca-Cola Classic
1993 Coca-Cola Ladies Pro-Am

Ladies Asia Golf Circuit wins (1)
1990 Thailand Ladies Open

Team appearances
Amateur
Commonwealth Trophy (representing Australia): 1983 (winners)
Tasman Cup (representing Australia): 1981 (winners), 1983 (winners)
Queen Sirikit Cup (representing Australia): 1983 (winners), 1984

See also
List of golfers with most Ladies European Tour wins

References

Australian female golfers
ALPG Tour golfers
Ladies European Tour golfers
Golfers from Brisbane
Sportswomen from Queensland
1962 births
Living people